The Texas Longhorns softball team represents The University of Texas at Austin in NCAA Division I intercollegiate softball competition. The Longhorns currently compete in the Big 12 Conference.

The University of Texas began varsity intercollegiate competition in softball in 1997; the softball team competed as a club team for one year in 1996. Texas has an all-time varsity win–loss record of 986–435–3 as of the end of the 2021 season. The Longhorns have won four regular season conference championships and four conference tournament championships in softball. (The Big 12 did not hold a softball tournament during the 2011 to 2016 seasons.) Texas has made 22 total appearances in the NCAA Tournament in 26 seasons of varsity competition, reaching the Women's College World Series (WCWS) six times (1998, 2003, 2005, 2006, 2013, 2022) and the super regional round, which was introduced in 2005, on eight occasions.

The Longhorns play their home games at Red & Charline McCombs Field, where they have compiled a record of 519–137–2 as of the end of the 2021 season. Texas hired fourth-year head coach Mike White, formerly head coach of the Oregon Ducks, on June 25, 2018.

History

Coaching history

Championships

Conference Championships

Conference Tournament Championships

Coaching staff

All-time season results

Information Source: 2019 Texas Longhorns Softball Media Guide – All-Time Series Records section

All-time series records

Big 12 members
*Through February 7, 2023.
Information Source: 2019 Texas Longhorns Softball Media Guide – All-Time Series Records section
2019 Season Results

Former Big 12 members
*Through February 7, 2023.
Information Source: 2019 Texas Longhorns Softball Media Guide – All-Time Series Records section
2019 Season Results

Individual honors, awards, and accomplishments

National honors and awards
National Player of the Year

Texas is the only program in the NCAA with three USA Softball Collegiate Player of the Year awards. Pitcher Cat Osterman, who won the award all three times, is the only player in NCAA history to have won the award more than twice.

Conference awards and honors
Sources:

Big 12 Player of the Year
Amy Hooks, 2011
Taylor Thom, 2014

Big 12 Pitcher of the Year
Cat Osterman, 2002, 2003, 2005, 2006
Blaire Luna, 2010

Big 12 Freshman of the Year
Jodi Reeves, 1997
Lindsay Gardner, 2000
Cat Osterman, 2002
Chez Sievers, 2003
Blaire Luna, 2010
Taylor Thom, 2011
Tiarra Davis, 2014

Big 12 Defensive Player of the Year
Megan Willis, 2006, 2007

Big 12 Newcomer of the Year
Christa Williams, 1998

Big 12 Coach of the Year
Connie Clark, 2002, 2006, 2010

Home Field

Through 2019 Season

Attendance Record

Through 2022 Season

No-Hitters
Texas pitchers have thrown 53 no-hitters, including 11 perfect games.

Retired numbers

Notes

 
Sports clubs established in 1997
1997 establishments in Texas